"Good Man" is a song by American recording artist Ne-Yo, released on February 6, 2018. It was written by Ne-Yo along with Darhyl "DJ" Camper Jr. for his same-titled seventh studio album (2018), while production was helmed by the latter. The song contains a sample of "Untitled (How Does It Feel)" (2000) as performed by D'Angelo. Due to the inclusion of the sample, D'Angelo and co-writer Raphael Saadiq are also credited as songwriters. Serving as the album's lead single, "Good Man" became Ne-Yo's first song to top the US Adult R&B Songs chart.

Charts

References

2018 singles
2018 songs
Ne-Yo songs
Songs written by Ne-Yo
Songs written by Darhyl Camper
Songs written by D'Angelo
Songs written by Raphael Saadiq